The 2009–10 Top League was the seventh season of Japan's domestic rugby union competition, the Top League. The Toshiba Brave Lupus defeated Sanyo Wild Knights by 6–0 in the final of the Microsoft Cup to claim their fifth Top League championship.

The Top League is a semi-professional competition which is at the top of the national league system in Japan, with promotion and relegation between the next level down.

Changes
 Honda Heat and Ricoh Black Rams were promoted to the Top League, replacing IBM Big Blue and Yokogawa Atlastars who were relegated.
 Last season's rule change of allowing three overseas players on the field at any one time was altered for the 2009–10 season; one of the three overseas players must have already represented Japan, be currently eligible to represent Japan or eligible to represent Japan in the future.
 Teams are allowed to field one player from the Asian Rugby Football Union (ARFU) outside the above restrictions on overseas players. That Asian player may have represented another country at Test, A or Sevens levels as long as that country is a Union member of the ARFU.
 Last season the top six finishers automatically qualified for the national championship; however, this season the top four qualify, with the teams that finish 5th to 10th playing off for the remaining two Top League qualifiers.

Teams

Regular season

Final standings

Fixtures and results

Round 1

Round 2

Title play-offs
Top four sides of the regular season competed for the Top League Championship (the play-offs were not sponsored for the 2009–10 season). The teams competing were Toshiba Brave Lupus, Sanyo Wild Knights, Toyota Verblitz and Suntory Sungoliath.

Semi-finals

Final

Wildcard play-offs
The two second round winners qualified for the All-Japan Rugby Football Championship.

First round
The Top League teams ranked 7th and 10th played-off for the right to meet the Top League team ranked 5th in the second round. The Top League teams ranked 8th and 9th played-off for the right to meet the Top League team ranked 6th in the second round. 

So Coca-Cola West Red Sparks and NEC progressed to the second round.

Second round
The Top League team ranked 5th played-off against the winner of the teams ranked 7th and 10th, and the Top League team ranked 6th played-off against the winner of the teams ranked 8th and 9th. The two winning second round teams advanced to the All-Japan Rugby Football Championship.

So Kobe and NEC advanced to the All-Japan Rugby Football Championship.

Top League Challenge Series

NTT Communications Shining Arcs and Toyota Industries Shuttles won promotion to the 2010–11 Top League via the 2010 Top League Challenge Series, while Mazda Blue Zoomers and Yokogawa Musashino Atlastars progressed to the promotion play-offs.

Promotion and relegation play-offs
Two promotion/relegation matches (Irekaesen) were played. The Top League team ranked 12th played-off against the Challenge 1 team ranked 3rd, and the Top League team ranked 11th played-off against the Challenge 2 team ranked 1st. The winners were included in the Top League for the following season.

So Kintetsu and Ricoh remained in the Top League for the following season.

Top Ten Points Scorers

Table notes
 Pts = Points scored
 T = Tries
 C = Conversions
 PG = Penalty Goals
 DG = Drop Goals

End-of-season awards

References

External links
 2009-10 draw
 Team Profiles (Japanese)
 Top League official site (Japanese)
 Top League video digest
 Final Table (Japanese)

Japan Rugby League One
1
Japan Top